Mary Elizabeth Peck (born 1952) is an American photographer.

Her work is included in the collections of the Museum of Fine Arts Houston, the Denver Art Museum, the Art Institute of Chicago, the University of Michigan Museum of Art, and the Smithsonian American Art Museum.

References

Living people
1952 births
20th-century American photographers
21st-century American photographers
20th-century American women artists
21st-century American women artists